was a Japanese waka poet and Confucian scholar of the late ninth and early tenth centuries. His exact birth and death dates are unknown but he flourished around 889 to 923. He was one of the Chūko Sanjūrokkasen and one of his poems was included in the Ogura Hyakunin Isshu.

Ten of his poems were included in the Kokin Wakashū and fifteen in later imperial anthologies.

The following poem by him was included as No. 23 in Fujiwara no Teika's Ogura Hyakunin Isshu:

References

Bibliography
McMillan, Peter. 2010 (1st ed. 2008). One Hundred Poets, One Poem Each. New York: Columbia University Press.
Suzuki Hideo, Yamaguchi Shin'ichi, Yoda Yasushi. 2009 (1st ed. 1997). Genshoku: Ogura Hyakunin Isshu. Tokyo: Bun'eidō.

9th century in Japan
9th-century Japanese poets
10th-century Japanese people
10th-century Japanese poets
Ōe clan
Japanese male poets
Hyakunin Isshu poets